Novodvinsk is a town in the north of Arkhangelsk Oblast, Russia, located on the left bank of the Northern Dvina,  south of Arkhangelsk. Population:

History
It was founded in 1935 as the settlement of Voroshilovsky serving a pulp and paper mill. It was granted urban-type settlement status in 1941, renamed Pervomaysky in 1958, and was granted town status in 1977, at which time it also got its present name. Simultaneously, Novodvinsk was removed from Primorsky District of Arkhangelsk Oblast and became the town of oblast significance.

Administrative and municipal status
Within the framework of administrative divisions, it is, together with one rural locality, incorporated as the town of oblast significance of Novodvinsk—an administrative unit with the status equal to that of the districts. As a municipal division, the town of oblast significance of Novodvinsk is incorporated as Novodvinsk Urban Okrug.

Economy

Industry
The economy of Novodvinsk is based on the timber industry. The main employer in the town is Arkhangelsk Pulp and Paper Mill. Additionally, there are a concrete construction plant and a plywood factory (which also produces furniture).

Transportation
The Northern Dvina is navigable in Novodvinsk, and there is some passenger navigation. There is also bus passenger service to Arkhangelsk. There is no passenger rail service.

Education
Novodvinsk has 14 kindergartens, 7 high schools, Novodvinsk Industrial College, and two higher education schools associated with Saint-Petersburg Academy of Management and Economics, and with Arkhangelsk Technical University.

Notable people
 Sergei Bykov (born 1983), Russian professional basketball player
 Leonid Yekimov (born 1987), Russian sport shooter

References

Notes

Sources

Cities and towns in Arkhangelsk Oblast
Cities and towns built in the Soviet Union
Populated places established in 1935